Hojancha is a canton in the Guanacaste province of Costa Rica. The head city is in Hojancha district.

History 
Hojancha was created on 2 November 1971 by decree 4887.

On 5 September 2012, a magnitude 7.6 earthquake struck 12 kilometers northeast of Hojancha, destroying houses in the canton.

Geography 
Hojancha has an area of  km² and a mean elevation of  metres.

The canton is in the midsection of the Nicoya Peninsula. It is relatively compact, with a slim area reaching south to encompass a small portion of the Pacific coastline from Carrillo Beach southward to the mouth of the Ora River.

Districts 
The canton of Hojancha is subdivided into the following districts:
 Hojancha
 Monte Romo
 Puerto Carrillo
 Huacas
 Matambú

Demographics 

For the 2011 census, Hojancha had a population of  inhabitants.

Transportation

Road transportation 
The canton is covered by the following road routes:

References 

Cantons of Guanacaste Province
Populated places in Guanacaste Province